Caribou is a small rural community in Pictou County, Nova Scotia, Canada.

Located on the Northumberland Strait northwest of the town of Pictou, Caribou is named after the Woodland Caribou which used to live in Nova Scotia.  Nearby geographic locations using the name include Caribou Harbour, a bay on which the community is situated, as well as the communities of Caribou Island, Central Caribou and Caribou River.

Caribou became an important port after it was selected by the federal government in the late 1930s to be the Nova Scotia terminal for a seasonal ferry service to Wood Islands in eastern Prince Edward Island.  The service, operated by Northumberland Ferries Limited since its inception in 1941, carries passenger, vehicle and truck traffic to Wood Islands, Prince Edward Island between May and December.

Caribou also hosts a small passenger-only seasonal ferry service to Pictou Island, departing from the small craft fishing harbour adjacent to the NFL ferry terminal.

Climate 
Astoundingly, from August 7-August 9, 2018, there were three consecutive tropical nights where the daily low temperature did not fall below 20.4 Celsius. Even more impressive was that 6 of the 31 days in August 2018 were all tropical nights where the temperature did not fall below 20.1 Celsius on any of these days.

References

Further reading
The Stories of Caribou, edited by Olive Prest Pastor, 1992

Communities in Pictou County